Carib Pidgin may refer to:

The Ndyuka-Tiriyó Pidgin, a pidgin language spoken in South America
The "men's language" spoken by the Island Caribs in the Caribbean

See also
Island Carib language